The 2008–09 Omani League was the 33rd edition of the top football league in Oman. It began on 23 October 2008 and finished on 27 May 2009. Al-Oruba SC were the defending champions, having won the previous 2007–08 Omani League season. On Wednesday, 27 May 2009, Al-Nahda Club lost 1-0 away in their final league match against Sur SC and emerged as the champions of the 2008–09 Omani League with a total of 45 points.

Teams
This season the league had 12 teams. Al-Wahda SC, Oman Club and Bahla Club were relegated to the Second Division League after finishing in the relegation zone in the 2007-08 season. The three relegated teams were replaced by Second Division League teams Sohar SC, Saham SC and Al-Shabab Club.

Stadia and locations

League table

Results

Season statistics

Top scorers

Media coverage

See also
2008 Sultan Qaboos Cup

References

Top level Omani football league seasons
1
Oman